Monte Ceneri is a mountain pass in Switzerland.

It may also refer to:

Monte Ceneri Rail Tunnel, below Monte Ceneri
Monte Ceneri Road Tunnel, below Monte Ceneri
Ceneri Base Tunnel, below Monte Ceneri
Monte Ceneri transmitter, on Monte Ceneri
Monteceneri, a municipality encompassing Monte Ceneri